Harpal Panwar (born 1 June 1945) is an Indian politician. He was born in the village of Nala in the Muzaffarnagar district. He was a Member of Indian Parliament (specifically Lok Sabha, from Kairana (Lok Sabha constituency)) for two terms in 1989 and 1991, and has served as the Minister of Rural Development. He is a well known leader of western Uttar Pradesh, where he has been involved in various movements of farmers.

Panwar was appointed Vice-Chairman of the Council for Advancement of People's Action & Rural Technology (CAPART). He is also the current vice-president of the Uttar Pradesh Congress Committee (UPCC).

References

1945 births
Living people
India MPs 1989–1991
India MPs 1991–1996
Lok Sabha members from Uttar Pradesh
People from Muzaffarnagar district
Janata Dal politicians